Kaffir lily is a common name which may refer to the following ornamental plants:

 Clivia miniata in the family Amaryllidaceae
 Hesperantha coccinea syn. Schizostylis coccinea in the family Iridaceae

The term kaffir is considered extremely racially offensive in South Africa, the native range of both plant species.